Lianggang Express Line is a commuter rail line currently under planning on the Shanghai Suburban Railway, and will be run by China Railway. The Lianggang Express Line is an express suburban railway between the Lingang New Area and Pudong Hub, Hongqiao Hub and Shanghai's main urban area. The plan published public review between April 29th to May 28th by the Shanghai Transportation Commission. The special plan (draft) was for the selection of the Shanghai City Line Lianggang Express Line (Pudong Hub-Lingang Industrial Park Station).

It runs from Lingang Industrial Park in Pudong to Shanghai East railway station (mainline) or Pudong International Airport T3 Terminal (branch) in Pudong. The  express line with  branch is expected to shorten the travel time between Lingang and Pudong International Airport to under 15 minutes upon completion in 2024. Construction is expected to start in 2021. The line is expected to open at the end of 2024. It will achieve one-hour access to important external transportation hubs for Lingang.

Urban transit operation is adopted with operations similar rapid transit, and passengers can use the Shanghai public transport card to enter and exit the station. The route from Pudong International Airport T3 terminal heads south along Lianggang Avenue, turns east at Dongda Highway, turns south at Qiaojiang Road, and enters the central activity area of Lingang New Area; the other line leads from Shanghai East Railway Station, and connect to Xiayan Road Station along the south side of Shenjiahu Expressway. Most of the route will be elevated.

History
In 2016, the Nanhui branch line was included in the plan in the Shanghai 2035 general plan. In November 2019, Zhu Zhisong, Deputy Secretary-General of the Shanghai Municipal Government and Executive Deputy Director of the Management Committee of the Lingang New Area of the Pilot Free Trade Zone, revealed that the Lingang New Area is to be connected to urban Shanghai via Pudong International Airport, Hongqiao International Airport, Shanghai South railway station, as part of a express railway network. The "Pudong Comprehensive Transportation Hub Special Plan" announced in February 2020 mentioned the Lianggang Express Line. The "Three-year Action Plan for Traffic Improvement in the Lingang New Area of China (Shanghai) Pilot Free Trade Zone (2020-2022)" published in March 2020 proposes to accelerate the implementation of the Lianggang Express Line before 2022. In April 2020, the "Higher Quality Integrated Development Plan for Transportation in the Yangtze River Delta" proposed "Planning and Construction of Shanghai Nanhui Branch Line". The development plan will last until 2025 and look forward to 2035. In June 2020, the China Railway Design Corporation began to conduct a feasibility study. The preliminary acceptance test will be completed in September 2020. From April 29th to May 28th, 2021, the Municipal Transportation Commission publicized the special plan (draft) for the selection of the Shanghai Lianggang Express Line (Pudong Hub ~ Lingang Industrial Park Station).

Proposed stations

Service routes

Future extensions
Future extension to Situan is under further planning.

References

Notes

Shanghai Metro lines
Proposed buildings and structures in Shanghai
Shanghai
Airport rail links in China